Ceionia Plautia (flourished 2nd century) was a Roman noblewoman and is among the lesser known members of the ruling Nerva–Antonine dynasty of the Roman Empire.

Life
Plautia was the second daughter born to Roman Senator Lucius Aelius Caesar, the first adopted heir of the Roman Emperor Hadrian (117-138) and Avidia. Plautia was born and raised in Rome. Her cognomen Plautia, she inherited from her mother and her grandmothers. She had three siblings: a sister called Ceionia Fabia; two brothers the Roman Emperor Lucius Verus who co-ruled with Marcus Aurelius from 161 to 169 and Gaius Avidius Ceionius Commodus. 

Her maternal grandparents were the Roman Senator Gaius Avidius Nigrinus and the surmised but undocumented noblewoman Plautia. Although her adoptive paternal grandparents were the Roman Emperor Hadrian and Roman Empress Vibia Sabina, her biological paternal grandparents were the consul Lucius Ceionius Commodus and noblewoman Plautia.

Plautia married Quintus Servilius Pudens, consul in 166. Plautia bore Pudens a daughter called Servilia, who married Junius Licinius Balbus, a man of consular rank. Servilia and Balbus had a son called Junius Licinius Balbus.

Sources
 Alan K. Bowman, Peter Garnsey, Dominic Rathbone, The Cambridge ancient history, Volume 11 Second Edition. 2000
 Anthony Richard Birley, Marcus Aurelius. London: Routledge, 2000.
 Guido Migliorati, Cassio Dione e l'impero romano da Nerva ad Antonino Pio: alla luce dei nuovi., 2003.
 C. Konrad, Plutarch's Sertorius: A Historical Commentary.  Chapel Hill: University of North Carolina Press, 1994.

Nerva–Antonine dynasty
Plautia
Ceionia
2nd-century Romans
2nd-century Roman women